WHLO (640 AM) is a commercial talk radio station licensed to Akron, Ohio, carrying a talk radio format. Owned by iHeartMedia, the station serves both the Akron and Canton metro areas as the local affiliate for ABC News Radio, The Clay Travis and Buck Sexton Show, The Sean Hannity Show, the Akron RubberDucks and the Akron Zips. WHLO's studios are located in North Canton, while the station transmitter is housed in Copley. In addition to a standard analog transmission, WHLO streams online via iHeartRadio.

History
The station traces its origin to WJAY, which began broadcasting in Cleveland on January 5, 1927, on 610 kHz. WJAY was purchased on October 30, 1936 by United Broadcasting, which also owned WHK in Cleveland. The new owners changed the call sign from WJAY to WCLE.

In August 1941 the Federal Communications Commission (FCC) adopted a "duopoly" rule, which restricted licensees from operating more than one radio station in a city. At this time, United Broadcasting owned two stations in Cleveland, WCLE and WHK, in addition to WHKC in Columbus. As part of a successful plan to avoid having to give up one of its Cleveland stations, United arranged for a frequency swap between WCLE, then on 610 kHz, and WHKC on 640 kHz. In order to conform to the duopoly restrictions, WCLE was moved from Cleveland to Akron, where its call sign was changed to WHKK on February 25, 1945, and its frequency to 640 kHz. This in turn made it possible for WHKC (formerly WBAV and WAIU) in Columbus to move from 640 to 610 kHz. 

In the 1950s, WHKK was in the forefront of stations broadcasting rock and roll, led by Pete "Mad Daddy" Myers. Myers' contribution to the story of rock and roll has been overshadowed by other better known DJs such as Alan Freed. He began his career in 1957 at WHKK, and he developed into one of the most distinctive DJs in the northeast. As Mad Daddy, he had a frenetic, rapid-fire patter delivered entirely in rhyme. Playing an eclectic mixture of rock and roll and rhythm and blues, he coined phrases still used today, such as "wavy gravy" and "mellow jello". By January 1958 he moved on to WJW radio in Cleveland, which he promptly left in June of that year. After staying off the air until August 1958 as required by his WJW contract, he switched to WHK in Cleveland, where he reached the peak of his popularity, hosting record hops and live after-midnight shows dressed in a Dracula costume.

WHKK became WHLO on January 18, 1960, reflecting "Hello Radio" due to its low dial position. The station continued to operate as a "daytimer" for many years, having to sign off at Los Angeles sunset for I-A clear channel signal KFI. This would mean that WHLO would stay on until around 7:30pm during the winter, and as late as 11:00pm during certain summer months. WHLO would attain nighttime service many years later, but it would only be at 500 watts as opposed to their 5,000 daytime signal. After airing a popular top-40 format featuring disk jockeys known as "The Good Guys," WHLO turned to news/talk radio in the mid-1970s. By then, the station came under the ownership of Susquehanna Radio Corporation, which had acquired WNYN-FM in Canton, changing the FM station's call sign to WHLQ in the process.

Some of the personalities on WHLO's first talk incarnation include Nick Anthony (now an executive at Rubber City Radio), Steve Cannon (later at WTVN), Steve Fullerton (later at multiple Cleveland stations), Ron Vereb (today with WKBN as "Ron Verb"), and Lee "Hacksaw" Hamilton (heard today on XEPRS in San Diego).

After a brief attempt at an all-news format, WHLO aired "Middle of the Road" music until Mortenson Broadcasting changed it to a religious format in 1987. This "Middle of the Road" format was a mixture of Big Band and ballads of the 1940s, 1950s & 1960s. Listeners tuning in then would have heard the likes of Don Dempsey in morning drive, Tom Joliffe, Norm Marriott, Brooks Morton, Chris "Daniels" Eicher, and Brad Davis. In news department was Christy Gibbs, Joe Shaheen, and Don Olson. On the weekends there was specialty programming including the Dick Waco show.

After the purchase by Mortenson Broadcasting at the first of 1987, the station began programming "Contemporary Christian" music, featuring core artists such as Russ Taff, Twila Paris, Amy Grant, The Imperials, White Heart, Phil Keaggy and many others. Garry Meeks served as General Manager for over ten years. Mortenson tagged the station "The Light". The station broadcast in "AM Stereo". Because AM Stereo didn't take off, on air references to it were mostly dropped. The summer 1996 program guide still referenced the station as "WHLO 640 AM STEREO". Some of the air talent over the years included Ben Birdsong, Brian Brooks, Ed Bostic, Jeff Dunn, David Pierce, Dan Popp, Jan Watson, Erick Hogue, and Brad England. The station aired "20 The Countdown Magazine" with host Jon Rivers each Sunday. Meteorologist Andre Bernier from WJW-TV (FOX 8) provided live weather from about 1994 until the programming change in 1997. Jan Watson moved to Canton's WNPQ 95.9 FM, which was, like WHLO, branded as "The Light". She served there until the station was bought by Educational Media Foundation in early 2022. 

About 20% of weekdays was dedicated to block programming. Between 9:00 a.m. and 1:00 p.m. the station aired mostly nationally known Christian teaching programs from Focus on the Family (James Dobson), In Touch (Charles Stanley), Thru the Bible (J. Vernon McGee), and several others. In 1995, Truth for Life (Alistair Begg) was added at 8:30 a.m., shortening the morning show by 30 minutes. Saturday and Sunday mornings also included paid block programming from various national and local ministries. An hour long locally produced talk show aired weekday evenings for a time in the early 1990s.

The talent produced several niche music programs. In 1989, Brad England began hosting a show that focused on Christian Rock called "Solid Rock" that aired from 10:00 p.m until midnight on Saturdays. Later it was called "House Party" and hosted by John Hassett. In 1996, Brian Brooks began hosting "Classics Lunch", which featured songs that at the time were the Contemporary Christian oldies, mainly from the late 1970s and early 1980s. According to GM Garry Meeks, it was the most popular music program they did over the ten years.

Sometime in the middle 1990s Mortenson relocated the studios from Fairlawn, joining the studios with their FM sister, WTOF, 98.1 at 2780 South Arlington Road. In October 1996, the trade paper Christian Research Report(CRR) reported that Mortenson was selling both stations to Salem Communications. The first week of June 1997 the announcement was made that effective Monday, June 8, music programming would change to one of Salem's inspirational satellite delivered formats, "The Word in Praise". The last song played by morning show hosts Brian and Jan, on Friday, June 5, was "Do I Trust You" by Twila Paris.

In 1998, Salem relocated WHLO's operations to their Independence facility.

Eventually the music programming was changed to Salem's "Solid Gospel" southern gospel format, another satellite delivered music format.

In the fall of 2001, WHLO was sold to Clear Channel Communications (which would become iHeartMedia in 2014). The station briefly simulcast Hot AC WKDD during this period, and adopted their second talk format (this time featuring syndicated talkers) in June 2002. 

On April 28, 2008, Matt Patrick began a local late-afternoon talk show, which later moved to late mornings. Patrick was known as the long-time morning host at WKDD, and continued that role along with the late afternoon show on WHLO. In December 2009, Patrick left his programs on both stations. In July 2009, WHLO began simulcasting on the FM radio band, via the HD2 (digital radio) subchannel of sister station WRQK (106.9 FM). On September 12, 2010, it moved to broadcasting on the HD2 of other sister station WKDD replacing the Club Phusion programming on the station's HD2 signal.

Programming
WHLO's lineup is entirely syndicated, including This Morning, America's First News with Gordon Deal, The Brian Kilmeade Show, The Clay Travis and Buck Sexton Show and The Sean Hannity Show, along with programs hosted by Joe Pags, Jesse Kelly, Todd Schnitt, and Dave Ramsey. Weekend offerings include In the Garden with Ron Wilson, At Home with Gary Sullivan, Leo Laporte The Tech Guy, Bill Handel on the Law, Sunday Night Live with Bill Cunningham, Somewhere in Time with Art Bell and the weekend editions of Coast to Coast AM.

WHLO is the radio home for both University of Akron Zips football and basketball, and the Akron RubberDucks baseball team, which is the AA affiliate for the Cleveland Guardians.

References

External links

 

News and talk radio stations in the United States
HLO
Radio stations established in 1927
1927 establishments in Ohio
IHeartMedia radio stations